Tekno Scienze Publisher is an academic publisher in Italy. It publishes 3 scientific journals in a broad range of scientific and technical disciplines: Chimica Oggi – Chemistry Today, Agro Food Industry Hi Tech, and Household and Personal Care Today.

References

External links 
 

Publishing companies of Italy
Publishing companies established in 1983